Leucosphaera may refer to:
 Leucosphaera (bivalve), a genus of bivalves in the family Lucinidae
 Leucosphaera (plant), a genus of plants in the family Amaranthaceae
 Leucosphaera, a genus of fungi in the family Bionectriaceae, synonym of Leucosphaerina